The 2011 Bulgaria antiziganist (anti-Gypsy) protests started during the night of 23 to 24 September 2011 in the village Katunitsa and later spread to other locations all over the country, including Plovdiv, Sofia, Varna, Burgas, Pleven, Ruse, Pazardzhik, Stara Zagora and others. The reason for the unrest was the murder of a local youth, who was run over by a car by the close associate of local Roma boss Kiril Rashkov. These protests were accompanied with racist chants and called for violence against Romani. The riots in Katunitsa led to the burning of two cars and four houses, owned by different members of the family of the alleged Romani crime boss Kiril Rashkov, also known as "Tsar Kiro". The United Nations and the OSCE condemned the demonstrations and the violence.

Background

The protests started in response to the vehicular homicide of 19-year-old Angel Petrov in Katunitsa. The murder was committed by 55-year-old Simeon Yosifov, who is believed to be a close associate of crime boss Kiril Rashkov. The death of Angel Petrov was preceded by death threats involving a "car accident", which were published in the Bulgarian video-sharing website "vbox7".

October protests

Protests continued on 1 October in Sofia, with 2000 Bulgarians marching against the Romani and what they viewed to be the "impunity and the corruption" of the political elite in the country.

Volen Siderov, leader of the far-right Ataka party and presidential candidate, spoke to a crowd at the Presidential Palace in Sofia, calling for the death penalty to be reinstated, as well as Romani ghettos to be dismantled.
Many of these organized protests were accompanied by ethnic clashes and racist violence against Romani. The protesters shouted racist slogans like "Gypsies into soap" and "Turks under the knife." Many protesters were arrested for public order offenses. The news media labelled the protests as anti-Romani Pogroms.

Political reaction
According to the BBC, President Georgy Parvanov called on the protesters for "an end to the language of hatred". Parvanov and Prime Minister Boyko Borisov called a meeting of the national security council to address the issue.

These protests came before the presidential elections on 23 October. Far-right Ataka party leader Volen Siderov tried to capitalise on the tensions and called for the death penalty to be reinstated and for Romani "ghettos" to be dismantled.
The United Nations and the OSCE condemned the demonstrations and the violence.

International reaction
Reuters attributed the protests and civil disturbances to the lack of an effective justice system in the country. Russian media emphasized the ethnic nature of the societal polarizations, expressing the belief that the Roma are indirectly benefiting due to a positive discrimination on the part of law enforcement agents.

References

Antiziganism in Europe
Far-right politics in Europe
Protests in Bulgaria
2011 in Bulgaria
Romani in Bulgaria
2011 protests
Pogroms
September 2011 events in Europe
Romani organized crime groups
Human rights abuses in Bulgaria